Kostromskoy (masculine), Kostromskaya (feminine), or Kostromskoye (neuter) may refer to:
Kostromskoy District, a district of Kostroma Oblast
Kostromskoy (cheese), a type of Russian cheese
Kostroma Oblast (Kostromskaya oblast), a federal subject of Russia
Kostromskaya (rural locality), a rural locality (a stanitsa) in Krasnodar Krai, Russia
Kostromskoye, a rural locality (a selo) in Sakhalin Oblast, Russia